iSync is a defunct application developed by Apple Inc., which syncs iCal and Address Book data to SyncML-enabled mobile phones, via Bluetooth or by using a USB connection. It was first released on Jan 2, 2003, with technology licensed from fusionOne. Support for many (pre-October 2007) devices was built-in, with newer devices being supported via manufacturer and third-party iSync Plugins.

History 
iSync's first beta was released on September 28, 2002.

In June 2003, The Register reported that an iSync 1.1 bug could lead to contacts without phone numbers being deleted from synced phones. iSync uses port 3004, which could also be blocked if the Mac OS X firewall was enabled.

Before the release of Mac OS X 10.4, iSync also synchronized a user's Safari bookmarks with the now-defunct .Mac subscription service provided by Apple.

Starting with Mac OS X 10.4, much of iSync's original syncing functionality was moved into the Sync Services framework, which developers can use to incorporate synchronization into their own applications. iSync, however, retained responsibility for the setup, configuration and synchronising of supported mobile handsets. Since the release of iTunes 4.8, the user interface for synchronizing iPods had been delegated to iTunes, although conflict-resolution and substantial changes to contact information (>5%) show an iSync panel. Synchronization with MobileMe (previously .Mac) was then the domain of MobileMe Sync, accessible through a System Preferences pane.

iSync was removed from Mac OS X in version 10.7 (Lion). However, since the underlying framework still existed in Lion and 10.8 (Mountain Lion), it was possible to restore the functionality of iSync using a 10.6 (Snow Leopard) installation or backup.

Device compatibility 
Before the release of iSync, Palm had released its own sync software, Palm Desktop for Mac, which it soon abandoned. Apple created its own software tool, called Palm Conduit, to make iSync compatible with Palm's HotSync protocol. iSync 2.0 directly integrated Palm Conduit. After the 2009 Palm Pre abandoned HotSync, Apple dropped Palm support from iSync 3.1 in Mac OS X Snow Leopard.

BlackBerry OS, Palm OS, and Windows Mobile (Pocket PC) devices were not officially supported by iSync, but could still be synchronized through the use of third-party iSync plug-ins.

Version history

See also 

 SyncML

References

External links

MacOS-only software made by Apple Inc.
Personal information managers
ITunes
IPod software